Chowtapalli is a village of land of legends in the state of Andhra Pradesh in India, is in the Krishna district, in Gudivada Mandal. It also has extended community towards National Highway and it is Kotha(New) Chowtapalli. Village is well known as birthplace of Famous singer Ghantasala Venkateswara Rao.

Veteran Producer Atluri Pundarikakshai Born on August 19, 1925 in Chowtapalli  village. Pundarikakshaiah produced 11 Telugu and Kannada films including hits such as Sri krishnavatharam(NTR), Mahamantri Thimmarusu, Manushullo Devudu, Maavari Manchitanam , Melukolupu and Aaradhana . He acted in 35 Telugu and Kannada films. He also provided the story for Hindi film, Udhar ka Sindhoor

Villages in Krishna district